McLaws is a surname. Notable people with the surname include:

Lafayette McLaws (1821–1897), United States Army officer and Confederate general
Shawn McLaws (born 1993), American soccer player
Virginia Randall McLaws (1872–1967), American painter and educator

See also
McLaws Circle